James Lennon was a member of the Wisconsin State Assembly.

Biography
Lennon was born on March 16, 1837, in Westmeath County, Ireland. In 1854, he settled in Freedom, Outagamie County, Wisconsin. During the American Civil War, he served with the 12th Wisconsin Volunteer Infantry Regiment of the Union Army, originally as an enlisted man and later as an officer. In 1872, Lennone moved to Appleton, Wisconsin.

Political career
Lennon was a member of the Assembly in 1883. Previously, he had been a member of the county board of Outagamie County, Wisconsin, in 1881, Sheriff of Outagamie County in 1873, 1874, 1878 and 1879 and town treasurer of Freedom in 1878, 1879, 1880 and 1881. He was a Democrat.

References

Politicians from County Westmeath
Irish emigrants to the United States (before 1923)
Politicians from Appleton, Wisconsin
Democratic Party members of the Wisconsin State Assembly
Wisconsin sheriffs
County supervisors in Wisconsin
City and town treasurers in the United States
People of Wisconsin in the American Civil War
Union Army officers
Union Army soldiers
1837 births
Year of death missing
People from Freedom, Outagamie County, Wisconsin